Richard Lowell Nygaard (born July 9, 1940) is a Senior United States circuit judge of the United States Court of Appeals for the Third Circuit.

Education and career

Richard Lowell Nygaard was born in Thief River Falls, Minnesota, on July 9, 1940. He received a Bachelor of Science degree cum laude from the University of Southern California in 1969 and a Juris Doctor from the University of Michigan Law School in 1971. He was a Petty Officer Second Class in the United States Naval Reserve from 1958 to 1964. He was in private practice in North East, Pennsylvania from 1972 to 1980. He was a judge on the Court of Common Pleas, Sixth District of Pennsylvania, Erie, Pennsylvania from 1981 to 1988.

Federal judicial service
Nygaard was nominated by President Ronald Reagan on May 25, 1988, to a seat on the United States Court of Appeals for the Third Circuit vacated when Judge Joseph F. Weis Jr. assumed senior status. He was confirmed by the United States Senate on October 14, 1988, and received his commission on October 17, 1988. He assumed senior status on July 9, 2005.  In 2017, Judge Nygaard partially dissented when the majority granted qualified immunity to police officers who prevented bystanders from recording video of them.

References

Sources
 

1940 births
20th-century American judges
Judges of the United States Court of Appeals for the Third Circuit
Living people
United States court of appeals judges appointed by Ronald Reagan
United States Navy sailors
University of Michigan Law School alumni